Propebela scalaroides is a species of sea snail, a marine gastropod mollusk in the family Mangeliidae.

Description
The length of the shell varies between 22 mm and 27 mm.

The small, white shell has an elongate-fusiform shape. The shell contains 7 slightly convex whorls. The spire is longer than the aperture. The shell is longitudinally plicate  
with about 20 ribs. The sharp apex resembles Propebela rugulata, and the same is the case with the operculum . The teeth of the radula have the broad typical form.

Distribution
This marine species occurs off Eastern Greenland and off Nova Zembla.

References

 Gofas, S.; Le Renard, J.; Bouchet, P. (2001). Mollusca. in: Costello, M.J. et al. (eds), European Register of Marine Species: a check-list of the marine species in Europe and a bibliography of guides to their identification. Patrimoines Naturels. 50: 180–213

External links
  Sars, G.O. (1878). Bidrag til Kundskaben om Norges arktiske Fauna. I. Mollusca Regionis Arcticae Norvegiae. Oversigt over de i Norges arktiske Region Forekommende Bløddyr. Brøgger, Christiania. xiii + 466 pp., pls 1–34 & I-XVIII
 Dyntaxa. (2013). Swedish Taxonomic Database
 

scalaroides
Gastropods described in 1878